California State Prison, Solano (SOL) is a male-only state prison located in the city of Vacaville, Solano County, California, adjacent to the California Medical Facility. The facility is also referenced as Solano State Prison, CSP-Solano, and CSP-SOL.

Facilities

SOL's  include the following facilities, among others:

 Level II housing: Open dormitories with secure perimeter fences and armed coverage
 Level III housing: Individual cells, fenced perimeters and armed coverage

Population and staff
As of fiscal year 2006/2007, SOL had a total of 1,308 staff and an annual operating budget of $158.4 million. As of February 2011, it had a design capacity of 2,610 but a total institution population of 5,050, for an occupancy rate of 193.5 percent.

As of July 31, 2022, SOL was incarcerating people at 124.7% of its design capacity, with 3,255 occupants.

History

The California State Prison at Solano opened in August 1984. SOL was overseen by the warden of the California Medical Facility until January 1992, when a separate warden was assigned. By 1998, SOL was so crowded that "emergency triple bunks" were added. In 2008/2009 triple bunking was removed and the gyms by August 2009 were not holding inmates.

A 2001 U.S. District Court ruling and a 2002 U.S. Court of Appeals decision supported the "right of Muslim inmates" at SOL "to attend regular weekly religious services and wear beards in accordance with their faith".

Notable inmates
William Ray Bonner (born 1948), spree killer 
Anthony Jacques Broussard (born c.1965), murderer of Marcy Renee Conrad 
Larry Green (born 1953), one of the Death Angels
Spoon Jackson (born 1957), murderer and poet
Sanyika Shakur (1963-2021), gang member; was interviewed at SOL; paroled
Johnny Spain (born 1949), member of the San Quentin Six; paroled in 1988
James Tramel (c.1967), Episcopal priest convicted of murder; was paroled by Arnold Schwarzenegger in 2006
Anthony Wimberly (born 1962), serial killer; sentenced to three years for burglary and robbery; paroled in 1983
Loi Nguyen, the only surviving perpetrator of the 1991 Sacramento hostage crisis

References

External links
 
 Solano State Prison Information from Ex-Inmates

1984 establishments in California
Prisons in California
Buildings and structures in Vacaville, California
Law enforcement in the San Francisco Bay Area